Jendouba (Formerly known as Souk El Arba until 30 April 1966) is a city in northwestern Tunisia, and capital of the Jendouba Governorate. It is an important crossroads with many road links to other towns such as El Kef, Tabarka, Ain Draham and Béja. The main economic activity is agriculture. It is close to the famous ancient Roman city of Bullaregia or Bulla Regia, as well as the ancient marble quarry of Chemtou. The city's name is derived from Amazigh with the exact translation being “land of grain.”

History 
Historically, this region was important and wealthy.

During the Roman Empire the town was called Libertina and was a civitas of the Roman Province of Byzacena in North Africa. The historical importance of the area is evidenced by the nearby great Roman cities of Bulla Regia and Chemtou. Several other historical sites witness the role this city played centuries ago in the economic life of the region.

Around 670 the town fell to the Muslim conquest of the Maghreb.

Under the French, Jendouba Ville is remembered as the Tunisian area where the civil demand for independence from French colonization started on April 9, 1934. The protests started in the town of Oued Meliz on April 4, 1934, before arriving in the capital and becoming a national movement.

The "events of April 9, 1938 " ( 9 أحداث أفريل 1938) were street protests demanding political reforms, including the establishment of a parliament, a major step towards the independence of Tunisia whilst a French protectorate. They resulted in a bloody shootout that marked the start of the Tunisian national movement.

During World War II there was an airfield outside the village. During Operation Torch, the town and was captured by paratroops of the British 1st Parachute Brigade on 16 November 1942.

It is also the birthplace of former Dallas Mavericks center Salah Mejri.

Climate
Jendouba has a hot-summer Mediterranean climate (Köppen climate classification Csa). In winter there is much more rainfall than in summer. About  of precipitation falls annually.

References

Notes

Populated places in Jendouba Governorate
Communes of Tunisia
Cities in Tunisia